Sansara dea is a moth in the family Cossidae. It was described by Yakovlev in 2006. It is found in Nepal.

The length of the forewings is about 20 mm. The forewings are light-yellow with a strongly lightened costal margin and hind margin. The central area of the wing is brown and there is a brown border along the outer margin. The hindwings are uniform white with a brown border.

References

Natural History Museum Lepidoptera generic names catalog

Zeuzerinae
Moths described in 2006